On the Boards is the second album by Irish rock band Taste, released on 1 January 1970. It is their final studio album and the release that brought Rory Gallagher to prominence, reaching number 18 on the UK Albums Chart. Reviewers have praised its variety and the precision of its ensemble playing, and noted the jazz inflections of Gallagher's guitar and his unaffected vocals. Lester Bangs dubbed it "impressive... progressive blues".

Track listing
All tracks composed by Rory Gallagher
"What's Going On" – 2:48
"Railway and Gun" – 3:38
"It's Happened Before, It'll Happen Again" – 6:33
"If the Day Was Any Longer" – 2:10
"Morning Sun" – 2:39
"Eat My Words" – 3:47
"On the Boards" – 6:02
"If I Don't Sing I'll Cry" – 2:40
"See Here" – 3:05
"I'll Remember" – 3:02

Personnel
Taste
Rory Gallagher - guitars, vocals, alto saxophone, harmonica
Richard "Charlie" McCracken – bass guitar
John Wilson – drums
with:
Eddie Kennedy - arrangements
Technical
Eddy Offord - engineer

References

Further reading

External links 
 

1970 albums
Taste (band) albums
Polydor Records albums